Vice-Admiral Harold Taylor Wood Grant,  (March 16, 1899 – May 8, 1965) was a Canadian naval officer and a post-war Chief of the Naval Staff. The son of Lieutenant Governor of Nova Scotia, MacCallum Grant, Harold Grant entered the Royal Canadian Navy as a cadet in 1914. He spent most of the First World War in training until 1917, when he became a midshipman aboard a British Royal Navy ship. Considered an above average officer, he was earmarked for early promotion during the interwar period and by 1938, commanded the destroyer .

During his time in command of Enterprise, he took part in the Battle of the Bay of Biscay, earning his Distinguished Service Order, the invasion of Normandy and bombardment of Cherbourg where he was wounded. He then commanded the Canadian cruiser  until war's end.

Following the war, Grant served as a staff officer and deputy to the Chief of the Naval Staff, Howard E. Reid. Grant succeeded Reid as Chief of the Naval Staff on September 1, 1947, and was made vice admiral. He commanded the Royal Canadian Navy through the early years of the Cold War and the Korean War, during which a series of personnel unrest, the restructuring of the navy, and the beginning of the anti-submarine warfare specialisation took place. Grant retired from the navy on December 1, 1951.

Early life
Grant was born on March 16, 1899, in Halifax, Nova Scotia, to Lieutenant Governor of Nova Scotia MacCallum Grant and Laura MacNeill Parker Grant. He had one sister and five brothers, one of whom was John Moreau Grant. He studied at the Royal Naval College of Canada at Halifax from 1914 to 1917. As a cadet, Grant was often ill but considered of good character and graduated with a first-class certificate.

Naval career

Early career
In 1919, Grant was promoted to sub-lieutenant and posted aboard  that saw service in the Baltic Sea. He returned to Canada in 1923. That year he was posted to  based at Halifax and  based at Vancouver, British Columbia, the following year. He returned to Canada again in 1934.

Considered an above average officer by senior Canadian officers Leonard W. Murray and George C. Jones, Grant was earmarked for early promotion and reached the rank of commander in 1935. Grant chose navigation as his specialty and attended Royal Navy staff courses. In 1932, he married Christian Mitchell of Halifax, from an old Haligonian family and a secretary to the deputy minister of Defence. He served as Director of Canadian Naval Plans and Director of Naval Reserves. It was during this period that the Chief of the Naval Staff, Percy W. Nelles rebuked Grant, having thought his promotion had gone to his head and earned a reprimand for poor behaviour. In 1936, Grant was sent back overseas to join the staff of the Royal Navy Commander-in-Chief, Atlantic Fleet and take further staff courses. In 1938, he returned to Canada and was appointed commanding officer of the destroyer .

Second World War

At the outbreak of the Second World War, Grant was a member of the command staff of the Atlantic Coast. Promoted to captain in 1940, he became Director of Naval Personnel. It was during this period that Grant suggested that the expansion of the navy be halted to consolidate and train the existing personnel. He was overruled. Grant was then sent east where he appointed Captain (D) in St. John's in command of the destroyers assigned to the Newfoundland Escort Force. Six months later he was made commanding officer of the Royal Navy cruiser  in March 1943. This was done by Nelles to give Canadian officers experience with larger ships as the Royal Canadian Navy was intending to acquire cruisers and aircraft carriers as the war continued. Six months later, he shifted his command to the cruiser . He was awarded the Distinguished Service Order for "gallantry and skill and good service in command of HMS Enterprise in an action with enemy destroyers".

On December 28, 1943, in the Bay of Biscay, Enterprise and fellow light cruiser,  took on 11 German destroyers. The two ships sank three German ships, damaged several other German ships and chased the rest of the German ships into a French port. He was Mentioned in Despatches for his service during the D-Day invasion of Normandy on June 6, 1944. During the invasion, Enterprise conducted shore bombardment in support of the invasion forces at Utah Beach. He was awarded the Bronze Star Medal by the United States for his actions during the naval bombardment of Cherbourg on June 25, 1944, during which he was wounded in an exchange with shore batteries. After leaving Enterprise, Grant returned to Royal Canadian Navy service and commissioned the cruiser  and deployed to the Pacific. However, the surrender of Japan ended the war before Ontario could arrive and instead Grant and the cruiser helped re-establish British control over Hong Kong. Grant was awarded the Companion of the Order of the British Empire in January 1946.

Chief of the Naval Staff
Grant was promoted rear admiral in February 1946 and was appointed Chief of Administration Services and Supply in Ottawa, Ontario. He served as deputy to Chief of the Naval Staff Howard E. Reid, but for the most part, influenced the policy of the time more than Reid. Following the end of the war, the Royal Canadian Navy was greatly reduced in size, with fewer ships and those ships in service only partially manned. Grant had a tendency to promote regular force officers over those of reserve backgrounds. He also maintained that senior officers did not require formal staff training. Grant was considered "blunt, arbitrary, a firm decision-maker and a sea-dog to the core."

By the time of Grant's promotion to vice admiral, appointment as the Chief of the Naval Staff and successor to Reid on September 1, 1947, the Minister of National Defence, Brooke Claxton sought to focus the navy's efforts on anti-submarine warfare (ASW) defence. Grant approved of Canada's new commitments to the North Atlantic Treaty Organization (NATO). However, he disapproved of Claxton's interference in naval affairs and some of these, including the re-arrangement of ranks within Canada's armed forces was one of the factors that led to a series of personnel unrest in 1949. Following the unrest, a commission was set up by Claxton headed by Rear-Admiral Rollo Mainguy. Grant wanted the commission to be internal, but Claxton refused. Mainguy was Grant's man on the commission while Claxton chose Louis Audette, a former naval reservist who disliked Grant. The report latter found that several deficiencies in morale, training and leadership. It also affirmed that a Canadian identity for the navy should be expanded. Grant had already put in motion several initiatives to correct them, with the exception of the Canadian identity. Grant initially refused to support this recommendation and it was only  with Claxton's pushing that Grant acted on it.

In 1950, the Korean War began and the Royal Canadian Navy was the only Canadian force able to send units immediately to the Korean Peninsula. At the same time, Grant was pushing for increased support for naval aviation and the new s. The Korean War allowed Grant to seek funds for naval expansion and seven of the  St. Laurents were authorised, along with increased personnel and active ships. The first of the St. Laurents,  was launched on November 30, 1951. On December 1, Grant retired. The launch of St. Laurent established Canada's naval identity for the remainder of the Cold War as an ASW-specialised force. Grant was succeeded as Chief of the Naval Staff by Vice-Admiral Rollo Mainguy. After retiring, he continued with naval life, serving as the president of the Royal Canadian Naval Benevolent Fund from 1956 to 1963. Grant died in Rockcliffe Park, Ottawa, Ontario on May 8, 1965. He was buried at Fairview Cemetery in Halifax. He was survived by his wife and three children.

Citations

Sources
 
 
 
 

1899 births
1979 deaths
Canadian admirals
Canadian military personnel from Nova Scotia
Canadian military personnel of World War I
Royal Navy personnel of World War II
Canadian Commanders of the Order of the British Empire
Canadian Companions of the Distinguished Service Order
People from Halifax, Nova Scotia
Royal Canadian Navy officers
Commanders of the Royal Canadian Navy